Isle of Sunken Gold is a 1927 American silent adventure film serial directed by Harry S. Webb. The film was long considered to be lost, however, chapters 4, 5, and 6 and reel 1 of chapter 7 were recently discovered in a European archive and retranslated back into English.

Plot
A ship captain gets a hold of half of a map leading to a treasure buried on an island in the South Seas. The ruler of the island, a beautiful princess, has the other half of the map, and the two join forces to battle a gang of pirates and a group of islanders who don't want anyone to get the treasure. It is discovered in a cave guarded by a ferocious fanged ape named Kong

Cast
 Anita Stewart as Princess Kala of Tafofu
 Duke Kahanamoku as Lono
 Bruce Gordon as Tod Lorre, captain of the Roamer
 Evangeline Russell as Lua
 Curtis 'Snowball' McHenry as Possum
 Jack P. Pierce (credited as John Pierce)

Chapter titles
 Isle of Sunken Gold
 Trapped in Mid-Air
 Engulfed by the Sea
 The Volcano's Pit
 The Hulk of Death
 The Prey of Sharks
 Fire of Revenge
 The Battle of Canoes
 Trapped by the Ape
 The Devil Ape's Secret

References

External links

1927 films
1927 adventure films
1927 lost films
American silent serial films
American black-and-white films
American adventure films
Films directed by Harry S. Webb
Films produced by Nat Levine
Lost American films
Mascot Pictures film serials
Treasure hunt films
Lost adventure films
1920s American films
Silent adventure films